Functional endoscopic sinus surgery (FESS), or functional endoscopic sinus surgery, is a procedure that is used to treat sinusitis and other conditions that affect the sinuses. Sinusitis is an inflammation of the sinuses that can cause symptoms such as congestion, headaches, and difficulty breathing through the nose.

FESS is a minimally invasive procedure that is performed using an endoscope, a thin, rigid tube with a camera on the end. The endoscope is inserted through the nostrils, allowing the surgeon to visualize the inside of the nasal passages and sinuses. The surgeon can then remove any tissue or obstruction that is blocking the sinuses, such as swollen or infected tissue.

FESS is generally considered to be a safe and effective treatment for sinusitis and other conditions that affect the sinuses. It can help to alleviate symptoms and improve the overall functioning of the sinuses. However, as with any medical procedure, there are potential risks and complications that should be discussed with a healthcare provider.

History 
The first recorded instance of endoscopy being used for visualization of the nasal passage was in Berlin, Germany in 1901. Alfred Hirschmann, who designed and made medical instruments, modified a cystoscope to be used in the nasal cavity. In October 1903, Hirschmann published "Endoscopy of the nose and its accessory sinuses." In 1910, M. Reichart performed the first endoscopic sinus surgery using a 7 mm endoscope. In 1925, Maxwell Maltz, MD created the term "sinuscopy," referring to the endoscopic method of visualizing the sinuses. Maltz also encouraged the use of endoscopes as a diagnostic tool for nasal and sinus abnormalities.

In the 1960s, Harold Hopkins, PhD at Reading University used his background in physics to develop an endoscope that provided more light and had drastically better resolution than previous endoscopes. Hopkins' rod optic system is widely credited with being a turning point for nasal endoscopy. Utilizing Hopkins' rod optic system, Austrian doctor Walter Messenklinger visualized and recorded the anatomy of the paranasal sinuses and the lateral nasal walls in cadavers. Specifically, Messerklinger focused on mapping out mucociliary routes. In 1978, Messerklinger published the book titled "Endoscopy of the Nose" on his findings, and his proposed methods to utilize nasal endoscopy for diagnosis.
Professor Heinz Stammberger, a head and neck surgeon who worked at the University of Graz with Professor Messerklinger was captivated by the technique and the implications for pathophysiology and treatment of sinus disease. He adopted the technique and became identified with it. He travelled the world advocating and popularizing the technique and he carried out multiple courses both at University of Graz and around the world. He later met David Kennedy, MD, of Johns Hopkins University, and together, they worked with the surgical instrument maker, Karl Storz to develop instruments for use in endoscopic sinus surgery, and coined the term Functional Endoscopic Sinus Surgery. Stammberger and Kennedy published multiple papers on FESS use and technique, and in 1985 the first North American course on FESS was taught at Johns Hopkins Medical Center. Heinz Stammberger, the chair of otolaryngology at University of Graz, and Kennedy, refined the techniques and provided hands-on teaching courses on the techniques throughout the world. Professor Stammberger retired from his position as the chair of the department in Graz and moved to Dubai where he worked with Professor Muaaz Tarabichi, also known as the father of endoscopic ear surgery, to establish TSESI: Tarabichi Stammberger  Ear and Sinus Institute, a center dedicated to the advancement of endoscopic ear and sinus surgery. Professor Stammberger died in 2018.

Medical applications 
Functional endoscopic sinus surgery is most commonly used to treat chronic rhinosinusitis (CRS), only after all non-surgical treatment options such as antibiotics, topical nasal corticosteroids, and nasal lavage with saline solutions have been exhausted. CRS is an inflammatory condition in which the nose and at least one sinus become swollen and interfere with mucus drainage. It can be caused by anatomical factors such as a deviated septum or nasal polyps (growths), as well as infection. Symptoms include difficulty breathing through the nose, swelling and pain around the nose and eyes, postnasal drainage down the throat, and difficulty sleeping. CRS is a common condition in children and young adults.

The purpose of FESS in treatment of CRS is to remove any anatomical obstructions that prevent proper mucosal drainage. A standard FESS includes removal of the uncinate process, and opening of the ethmoid air cells and Haller cells as well as the maxillary ostium, if necessary. If any nasal polyps obstructing ventilation or drainage are present, they are also removed. In the case of paranasal sinus/nasal cavity tumors (benign or cancerous), an otolaryngologist can perform FESS to remove the growths, sometimes with the help of a neurosurgeon, depending on the extent of the tumor. In some cases, a graft of bone or skin is placed by FESS to repair damages by the tumor.

In the thyroid disorder known as Graves' ophthalmopathy, inflammation and fat accumulation in the orbitonasal region cause severe proptosis. In cases that have not responded to corticosteroid treatment, FESS can be used to decompress the orbital region by removing the ethmoid air cells and lamina papyracea. Bones of the orbital cavity or portions of the orbital floor may also be removed.

The endoscopic approach to FESS is a less invasive method than open sinus surgery, which allows patients to be more comfortable during and after the procedure. Entering the surgical field via the nose, rather than through an incision in the mouth as in the previous Caldwell-Luc method, decreases risk of damaging nerves which innervate the teeth. Because of its less-invasive nature, FESS is a common option for children with CRS or other sinonasal complications.

It has been suggested that one of the main objectives in FESS surgery is to allow for the introduction of local therapeutic agents (such as steroids) to the sinuses. Research has shown that a special modification of the nozzle of the nasal spray in patients who had FESS allows for better delivery of local therapeutic agents into the ethmoid sinuses.

Outcomes and complications 
Functional Endoscopic Sinus Surgery is considered a success if most of the symptoms, including nasal obstruction, sleep quality, olfaction and facial pain, are resolved after a 1-2 month postoperative healing period. Reviews of FESS as a method for treating chronic rhinosinusitis have shown that a majority of patients report increased quality of life after undergoing surgery. The success rate of FESS in treating adults with CRS has been reported as 80-90%, and the success rate in treating children with CRS has been reported as 86-97%. The most common complication of FESS is cerebrospinal fluid leak (CSFL), which has been observed in about 0.2% of patients. Generally, CSFL arises during surgery and can be repaired with no additional related complications postoperatively. Other risks of surgery include infection, bleeding, double vision usually lasting a few hours, numbness of the front teeth, orbital hematoma, decreased sense of smell, and blindness. The medial rectus muscle may be damaged. Blindness is the single most serious complication of FESS, and results from damage to the optic nerve during surgery. Serious complications such as blindness occur in only 0.44% of cases, as determined by a study performed in the United Kingdom. A Cochrane review in 2006 based on three randomized control trials concluded that FESS has not been shown to provide significantly better results than medical treatment for chronic rhinosinusitis. Another Cochrane review looked at postoperative care of patients after FESS using debridement (removal of blood clots, crusts, and secretions from the nasal and sinus cavities under local anaesthetic), but the evidence from the available clinical trials was uncertain. The debridement procedure after FESS may make little or no difference to health‐related quality of life or disease severity. There may be a lower risk of adhesions but whether this has any impact on long‐term outcomes is unknown. Functional sinus surgery had been grossly overutilized as a way of treating headache based on an assumption of a sinus etiology of the different types of primary headache. Many patients, primary care providers, and even specialists confuse any frontal migraine for sinus disease. Multiple attempts at further definition of primary headache and or sinus headache has been suggested by the International Headache Society and the American Academy of Otolaryngology-Head and Neck Surgery. It has been suggested early on that such a confusion might be  a cause of failure of functional endoscopic sinus surgery.

References 

Endoscopy
Otorhinolaryngology
Sinus surgery